This is a list of the 81 members of the European Parliament for Italy in the 1979 to 1984 session.

List

Notes

1979
List
Italy